The women's 48 kg judo competition at the 2016 Summer Paralympics was held on 8 September at Carioca Arena 3.

Results

Repechage

References

External links
 

W48
Judo at the Summer Paralympics Women's Extra Lightweight
Paralympics W48